James Farrell (c. 1830-after 1883) was a New Zealand policeman. He was born in Ireland about 1830.

References

1830s births
New Zealand police officers
Irish emigrants to New Zealand (before 1923)
Year of death uncertain